is a horror-themed light gun shooter arcade game and the second game in The House of the Dead series of video games. The direct sequel to The House of the Dead, it was developed by Sega for arcades on the Sega NAOMI board in November 1998, then ported to the Dreamcast in 1999 and Microsoft Windows in 2001, and is also found on the Xbox as an unlockable bonus in The House of the Dead III. The game appears in the compilation The House of the Dead 2 & 3 Return for Wii. The Dreamcast version became a Sega All Stars title.

The games story picks up slightly over a year after the original game, and follows several AMS agents investigating a zombie outbreak in Italy. The protagonists are tasked find the source of the attack while also locating a missing agent, known as G.

Gameplay
The House of the Dead 2 is a rail shooter light gun game. It includes an auto-reload feature that allows players to point their guns off-screen to reload their weapons without pulling the trigger. Players must shoot their way through hordes of zombies and other monsters while attempting to rescue civilians being attacked. Health is represented by torches at the bottom of the screen and are lost when the play is hit by an enemy or shoots a civilian. Bonus health can be awarded by rescuing civilians and finding first aid kits hidden in crates and barrels. Like the first game, it incorporates a branching path system that allows for a variety of different routes in each stage depending on the players actions. This is expanded upon with far more paths than the original and can even lead to completely different stage layouts/locations, although the general story itself will always remain the same.

The game served as the springboard for the arcade, Sega Dreamcast, and PC release The Typing of the Dead, the Nintendo DS release English of the Dead, as well as the inspiration for the Game Boy Advance game, The Pinball of the Dead.

The flashbacks to the first The House of the Dead in the game's introductory sequence were recorded using the game's engine.

Plot 

AMS Agent G's further investigation on the 1998 Curien Mansion incident leads to his mysterious disappearance upon his discovery of the remnants of Dr. Curien's operations in Venice, Italy, where a zombie outbreak takes place.

On February 26, 2000, American AMS agents James Taylor and Gary Stewart are dispatched with their fellow agent Harry Harris and his British AMS partner Amy Crystal, to investigate and evacuate the populace of Venice. They suddenly encounter the impish Zeal, who had recently dealt with G. Upon finding a wounded G alive in a local library, James and Gary converse with him. G gives them a field journal showing the bosses and their weak points. The pair are then met with a massive undead horde, similar to the kind from the Curien Mansion incident. They continue on, trying to save the town's civilians from the zombies.

During the chaos, James and Gary face Judgment; consisting of Zeal and his giant, headless, axe-wielding armoured puppet Kuarl. After killing it, they meet up with Amy and Harry, who split up and try to meet at Sunset Bridge (or the wharf, depending on the player's actions). Upon getting there the group faces off with The Hierophant, an aquatic fishlike humanoid which heads an assault on Venice's waterways and Central Plaza. Upon defeating it, James, Gary, Amy and Harry get on a boat and continue through the rivers.

It is revealed that the zombies were created by Caleb Goldman, the man who financed Dr. Curien's creations during the Curien Mansion incident. It is also revealed that Goldman created the new zombies and released them into the city. Goldman leaves a message on Amy's phone, inviting them to meet him at the Colosseum, which Harry fears to be a trap. James and Gary split up again, and face off with a group of five fiery serpents known as The Tower. After killing the mother serpent, they receive a phone call for help from Amy, before getting cut off. The two quickly race to the Colosseum only to discover Amy and a wounded Harry, injured by Strength, a giant, chainsaw-wielding zombie which wounds Harry and chases James and Gary throughout the arena. After they kill it, James and Gary push on, while Amy tends to Harry's wounds. They drive over to Goldman's tower, fighting a revived Judgment, the Hierophant, and Tower.

Upon reaching the headquarters, they are confronted by Curien's masterpiece, The Magician, who was also revived by Goldman to oversee the birth of The Emperor, a shapeshifting crystalline entity with mastery over magnetism designed to protect nature from humanity. After defeating the Magician, they head to the top of the tower to confront the Emperor. In its prototype stage, the Emperor is not as strong as Goldman had hoped, and falls to the AMS agents. In order to evade being arrested, Goldman commits suicide by throwing himself off the roof of his building.

Players are given different endings based on the following conditions:
 If a solo game was finished as either player 1 or 2
 If both players defeated the last boss
 Number of continues
 Points earned

In the good ending, James and Gary run into Thomas Rogan, the main character from the first game, who tells them that G and Harry are all right, and that they should head off to their next battle "as long as they have the will to live" (in the case of James) or "as long as there is an answer" (in the case of Gary). In the normal ending, as James and Gary leave the building, they are greeted by G, Amy and Harry, as well as a large group of civilians, who thank them for their help. In the bad ending, James and Gary run into a zombified Goldman outside the building. As the screen goes white, a gunshot is heard.

Development

Ports
The House of the Dead 2 was later ported to the Dreamcast, as a launch title for the system, Xbox, as an unlockable on the Xbox port of The House of the Dead 3, PC, and Wii, in a double release with The House of the Dead 3. It was also the second, and final game in The House of the Dead series to appear on a Sega console, with the original The House of the Dead for the Sega Saturn being the first.

Reception

In Japan, Game Machine listed The House of the Dead 2 on their January 1, 1999 issue as being the third most-successful dedicated arcade game of the month.

The Dreamcast version received "favorable" reviews, while the PC version received "average" reviews according to the review aggregation website GameRankings.

AllGame gave the arcade version a score of four-and-a-half stars out of five.  In Japan, Famitsu gave the Dreamcast version 33 out of 40. IGN praised the same console version's detailed level design and varied enemy designs but criticized poor voice acting. GameSpot said of the same console version, "Just a gun that lines up with the sights doesn't seem too much to ask for." Game Informer ranked it at number 99 in its best games of all-time list in 2001. The staff praised it for its expansion of its predecessor's gore and intensity, but noted that the lack of a light gun accessory for the Dreamcast version was disappointing.

Blake Fischer reviewed the Dreamcast version of the game for Next Generation, rating it two stars out of five, and stated that "Without the light gun, this game is a complete loss. With a gun, it's better, but not for very long."

A consensus among reviewers was that the quality of the English voice acting was very poor, with one calling it "easily some of the worst in the genre". Others found it to be so bad that it became amusing.

Notes

References

External links

 
 

1998 video games
1990s horror video games
Arcade video games
Cooperative video games
Dreamcast games
Light gun games
Multiplayer and single-player video games
Rail shooters
Sega arcade games
Sega video games
SIMS Co., Ltd. games
The House of the Dead
Video game sequels
Video games set in 2000
Video games set in Venice
Wii games
Windows games
WOW Entertainment games
Video games developed in Japan